Dayne Tristan St. Clair (born May 9, 1997) is a Canadian professional soccer player who plays as a goalkeeper for Major League Soccer club Minnesota United and the Canada national team.

Prior to playing for Minnesota United, St. Clair was a two-year starter for the Maryland Terrapins men's soccer program. With Maryland, he was the starting goalkeeper for their national championship run, where he earned the NCAA Division I Men's Soccer Tournament Most Outstanding Player for the best defensive soccer player in the national tournament.

Prior to playing college soccer for the University of Maryland, St. Clair played youth soccer for Vaughan SC and helped the Azzuri win a League1 Ontario title. St. Clair also played high school soccer for Notre Dame Catholic Secondary School. St. Clair also appeared for the Canada men's national under-18 soccer team.

Early life
Born to a Trinidadian father and Scottish Canadian mother, he began playing soccer at age three with the Epiphany Church Soccer League, before joining North Scarborough SC at age 4. He also played with Pickering SC, Ajax SC, and Vaughan Azzurri.

College career 
Entering the 2015 NCAA Division I men's soccer season, St. Clair was redshirted. During his redshirt freshman year in 2016, St. Clair served as a backup to Cody Niedermeier, making two college appearances for the program. Entering the 2017 NCAA Division I men's soccer season, St. Clair became the regular starter for Maryland, making his first college soccer start for Maryland on August 25, 2017, in a 4–2 win against Santa Clara. St. Clair finished his Maryland career making a total of 43 appearances for the program.

Club career

Early career 
St. Clair played for League1 Ontario club Vaughan Azzurri in 2014 and 2015. During the 2016 and 2017 PDL seasons, St. Clair made fourteen appearances with K-W United FC. During the 2018 PDL season, St. Clair played with the New York Red Bulls under 23 team.

Minnesota United 
On January 4, 2019, ahead of the 2019 MLS SuperDraft, St. Clair signed a Generation Adidas contract with Major League Soccer, forgoing his final season of eligibility. On January 11, 2019, St. Clair was drafted seventh overall in the 2019 MLS SuperDraft by Minnesota United FC. St. Clair said of getting drafted, "I wanted to make a statement to the person I am, the player I am. This is my statement." In April 2019, St. Clair was loaned out to Minnesota's USL affiliate club, Forward Madison FC. He made his league debut for the club on April 6, 2019, playing all ninety minutes in a 1–0 defeat to Chattanooga Red Wolves.

In February 2020, it was announced that Minnesota had loaned St. Clair out once again, this time to USL Championship side San Antonio FC. On August 15, 2020, San Antonio announced that St. Clair had been recalled by Minnesota, where he played the last 13 games of the regular season and three 2020 MLS Cup Playoff games, conceding just 15 goals and with eight clean sheets. Upon conclusion of the 2021 season, St Clair would sign a 3 year extension with Minnesota United through the end of the 2024 season, with a club option for 2025.

International career
St. Clair was born in Canada to a Trinidadian father and Canadian-Scottish mother. St. Clair was named to the Canada U-23 provisional roster for the 2020 CONCACAF Men's Olympic Qualifying Championship on February 26, 2020. He accepted an invite for the Canada senior national team camp for January 2021. He made his debut for the senior team on June 5, 2021, playing the whole game in a 7-0 FIFA World Cup qualification victory over Aruba. On July 1 St. Clair was named to the Canada squad for the 2021 CONCACAF Gold Cup.

In November 2022 St. Clair was named to Canada's squad for the 2022 FIFA World Cup.

Career statistics

Club

International

Honours 
Individual
 NCAA Tournament Defensive MVP: 2018
 MLS All-Star: 2022
 MLS All-Star Game MVP: 2022

References

External links 
 
 
 
 Dayne St. Clair at Maryland Athletics
 
 

1997 births
Living people
Association football goalkeepers
Canada men's youth international soccer players
Canada men's international soccer players
Canadian expatriate soccer players
Canadian expatriate sportspeople in the United States
Canadian sportspeople of Trinidad and Tobago descent
Canadian people of Scottish descent
Canadian soccer players
Expatriate soccer players in the United States
K-W United FC players
Maryland Terrapins men's soccer players
Minnesota United FC draft picks
Minnesota United FC players
NCAA Division I Men's Soccer Tournament Most Outstanding Player winners
New York Red Bulls U-23 players
Forward Madison FC players
San Antonio FC players
People from Pickering, Ontario
Soccer people from Ontario
USL League Two players
USL League One players
USL Championship players
Major League Soccer players
Vaughan Azzurri players
2021 CONCACAF Gold Cup players
2022 FIFA World Cup players